Vernon Amy Tomes (22 February 1932 – 1999) was Deputy Bailiff of Jersey in the Channel Islands from 1986 to 1992.

Early years 
Tomes was born in St John, Jersey the son of Wilfred James Tomes, a former Connétable of the parish, and Florence Annie Amy. He was educated at St John's Elementary School and (on a States of Jersey scholarship) at Victoria College, Jersey.

Career 
In 1951, Tomes qualified as a solicitor of the Royal Court of Jersey. He was elected to the States of Jersey as Deputy for St Helier No. 2 District in 1960 and served until 1969 presiding over several committees. In 1969 he was appointed HM Solicitor General and was HM Attorney General between 1975 and 1985.

He was appointed as Deputy Bailiff in 1986 and served in the post until he was removed from office in 1992, at the request of the Bailiff Sir Peter Crill, by the United Kingdom's Home Secretary Kenneth Clarke. According to Sir Peter Crill, Tomes was accused by the police of tipping off a friend about a drugs raid on a nephew's home and the office received complaints that Tomes was slow in producing written judgments.

In the 1993 elections, Tomes topped the poll to become a Senator.

References

Sources
Alastair Layzell (ed), Who's Who in the Channel Islands 1987 (Jersey 1987)

1932 births
1999 deaths
People from Saint John, Jersey
Jersey lawyers
Judiciary of Jersey
20th-century British lawyers
Deputy Bailiffs of Jersey